Hurlet (or The Hurlet) is a small semi-rural district and former mining village, straddling the Renfrewshire-East Renfrewshire-Glasgow border near the town of Barrhead in the lowlands of Scotland.

During the late twentieth century, most of the Hurlet was consigned to the history books when the Paisley-East Kilbride road, which cut through the village, was widened to become a dual carriageway.

Roughmussel is to the northeast of The Hurlet. Househill Park is to the east, through which the Levern Water flows. The southwest of The Hurlet is St. Conval's Cemetery in Barrhead.

Sir Isaac Holden, 1st Baronet was born here in 1807.

References

Areas of Glasgow